COP9 signalosome complex subunit 3 is a protein that in humans is encoded by the COPS3 gene. It encodes a subunit of the COP9 signalosome.

The protein encoded by this gene possesses kinase activity that phosphorylates regulators involved in signal transduction. It phosphorylates I-kappa-B-alpha, p105, and c-Jun. It acts as a docking site for complex-mediated phosphorylation. The gene is located within the Smith-Magenis syndrome region on chromosome 17.

See also 

Signalosome

References

External links

Further reading